The smoot  is a nonstandard, humorous unit of length created as part of an MIT fraternity pledge to Lambda Chi Alpha by Oliver R. Smoot, who in October 1958 lay down repeatedly on the Harvard Bridge between Boston and Cambridge, Massachusetts, so that his fraternity brothers could use his height to measure the length of the bridge.

Description
One smoot is equal to Oliver Smoot's height at the time of the prank, . The bridge's length was measured to be  "± 1 εar" with the "±" showing measurement uncertainty and spelled with an epsilon to further indicate possible error in the measurement. Over the years the "±" portion and "ε" spelling have gone astray in many citations, including some markings at the site itself, but the "±" is recorded on a 50th-anniversary plaque at the bridge's end.

History

Oliver R. Smoot was selected by his Lambda Chi Alpha fraternity pledgemaster because he was the pledge deemed shortest—which made measuring the bridge the most labor-intensive—and he was the "most scientifically named". To implement his use as a unit of measure, Smoot repeatedly lay down on the bridge, let his companions mark his new position in chalk or paint, and then got up again. Eventually, he got tired from so much exercise and was carried thereafter by the fraternity brothers to each new position.

Smoot graduated from MIT in 1962, and then attended Georgetown University Law Center in Washington, D.C., where he obtained his Juris Doctor. He served as chairman of the American National Standards Institute from 2001 to 2002, and then as president of the International Organization for Standardization from 2003 to 2004. He is a distant relative of Nobel Prize in Physics winner George Smoot.

Public knowledge and interest in the story began when Holiday investigated the marks on the bridge years later, and published an interview with Smoot. The prank's fiftieth anniversary was commemorated on October 4, 2008, as Smoot Celebration Day at MIT, which Smoot attended.

In 2011, smoot was one of the 10,000 new words added to the fifth edition of the American Heritage Dictionary.

On May 7, 2016, Smoot served as Grand Marshal of the alumni parade across the bridge, celebrating the 100th anniversary of MIT's move from Boston to Cambridge.

Practical use

The bridge is marked with painted markings indicating how many smoots there are from where the sidewalk begins on the Charles River bank in Boston, with a number every ten smoots. The marks are repainted each semester by the incoming associate member class (similar to pledge class) of Lambda Chi Alpha.

Markings typically appear every , but additional marks appear at other numbers in between. For example, the  mark is accompanied by a mark for 69.  The  mark is accompanied by the words "Halfway to Hell" and an arrow pointing towards MIT. In recent years, graduating classes have begun to paint a special mark for their graduating year.

The markings are recognized as milestones on the bridge, to the degree that during bridge renovations in the 1980s, the Cambridge, Massachusetts, police department requested that the markings be restored, since they were routinely used in police reports to identify locations on the bridge. The renovators at the Massachusetts Highway Department also scored the concrete surface of the sidewalk on the bridge at  intervals instead of the conventional . The Lambda Zeta (MIT) chapter of Lambda Chi Alpha, which created the smoot markings, continues to repaint the markings once or twice per year.

Starting in 2011, Google Earth enabled the ability to measure distance using smoots, with the standard length of 5 feet 7 inches.

See also
 List of unusual units of measurement

References

External links

 The smoot as a unit of length

 The Smoot story, in Oliver Smoot's own words
 
 A December, 2005 National Public Radio Interview with Oliver Smoot upon his retirement
 What's A Smoot? NPR.org

1958 introductions
Eponyms
Human-based units of measurement
Lambda Chi Alpha
Massachusetts culture
Massachusetts Institute of Technology student life
Units of length
University folklore